The Geamăna is a left tributary of the river Olt in Romania. It flows into the Olt near Buciumeni.

References

Rivers of Olt County
Rivers of Vâlcea County
Rivers of Romania